Alhaurín el Grande is a town located in the province of Málaga in the autonomous community of Andalusia in  southern Spain.

It covers an area of 73.1 km2 extending from the northern slope of the Sierra de Mijas and the plain of the Guadalhorce river, where alternate crops of citrus and other fruit trees orchards are found. The population reaches 23,675 inhabitants, according to 2010 data.

The origin of the name was given by the Arabs, who called it "Alhaurin", where the Catholic Monarchs added "el Grande" to distinguish it from the neighboring town of Alhaurín de la Torre after the conquest of both sites in 1485.

It is situated between the river Fahala and the stream of Blas González. The coast is close by and there is a network of roads to get there. There is a road to Málaga Airport and Torremolinos, which takes about 30 minutes by car. A new road was built in 2010 connecting the town with Fuengirola and the beach which is only 20 minutes drive. There is also another new road to Marbella, to the southwest with Mijas just along a winding road round the mountain.  From Alhaurín there is a  view over the "Hoya de Málaga", Málaga's vale, full of lemon trees and other fruit trees.

Villafranco del Guadalhorce is a village within Alhaurín el Grande's municipal term. It was founded by colonist families in the 1950s and subsidized by the Instituto Nacional de Colonización of the Spanish government.

Geography
Alhaurin el Grande is located on the north side of the Sierra de Mijas at a height of 326 meters above sea level, with a benign climate of mild winters and hot summers and more than two thirds of the days per year have sunshine. It is 29 km from Málaga and 18 km from Marbella.

Its inhabitants are known as alhaurinos or laurinos. It is the thirteenth largest city in the entire province of Málaga in population, second only to coastal municipalities, the cities of Ronda and Antequera and nearby Alhaurin de la Torre (2009). It has a population around 25,000, but there is a large presence of foreigners settled in the town, estimated to represent nearly 5% of the total population. It also contains the neighborhoods of Chorro or San. Anton, el Bajondillo, San Isidro or Camino de Coin, la Huerta or el Barrio del Alemán, la Fama or the neighborhood of Palustre, plus several developments such as La Paca, La Chíchara, El Cigarral or Sierra Gorda and the hamlet of Villafranco del Guadalhorce.

History

In the municipality traces of different civilizations have been found, from the oldest to abundant Roman and Moorish remains. The municipality of Alhaurín el Grande has seen the history of Phoenicians, Greeks, Romans, Visigoths and Arabs that have settled nearby.

In the forested areas southeast of Alhaurín el Grande, there are traces of Neolithic occupation, witnesses to the long history of human habitation of the area. These traces were found at Las Huertas Altas and near La Casa Forestal.

Subsequently, the agricultural growth of the place took a big leap in quality with the arrival of the Greeks, who left their methods of cultivating the land, olive trees and prune grafted vines.

By the time the Romans arrived, the tiny Iberian settlement in the Sierra de Mijas was already well established, but if it had a name the Romans chose not to keep it. Instead they gave it one of their own. The village became Lauro Nova. It was a spot apparently blessed by the gods: fertile, temperate, and surrounded by hills riddled with valuable mineral deposits. Roman villas popped up around the centre of the village and the hills are still dotted with their remains. There is also evidence of the existence of different settlements in various parts of the term municipal of Alhaurin el Grande, such as: Dehesa Baja Camino de Coín o la Alquería during the Roman period. The most important are those of the Fuente del Sol and Huerta del Niño, named after a burial with a tombstone of a young Roman having been discovered. Numerous Roman remains and objects such as columns, ceramics and coins have been found.

It was a golden age which became a little tarnished during the time of the Visigoths. The town was in no danger of disappearing, but its development was exceedingly slow. It was not until the Moors took it on and built it a fortress on a hilltop called Torres de Fahala that it began to move again. The Moors also gave it a new name, Alhaurín, meaning "Garden of Allah". Like the Romans before them, they linked the township to a second to which they gave the same name, the two now being known as  Alhaurín el Grande and Alhaurín de la Torre. To the Romans they had been Lauro Nova and Lauro Vetus.

The fort was destroyed in the destructive zeal of the Reconquista, but at least the village survived. In the following centuries the town suffered from invasions, epidemics of plague, and an earthquake in 1680. During the Peninsular War of 1808–14 it was occupied for four years by French troops and suffered considerable bombardment.  Recently, there have been large-scale building projects, which are being investigated for corrupt practices.

Demography 
From:INE Archiv

Monuments and places of interest
 Arco árabe del Cobertizo  
 Columnas romanas de la Plaza de Ayuntamiento
 Iglesia de la Encarnación (Alhaurín el Grande)|Iglesia de Nuestra Señora de la Encarnación
 Ermita de San Sebastián
 Ermita de la Santa Vera Cruz
 Ermita del Cristo de las Agonías
 Ermita de San Antón
 Ruinas  de la Fortaleza de Fahala o Castillo de la Reina
 Torre vigia de Urique
 Fuente Lucena o de los Doce Caños  
 Molino de la Paca
 Molino morisco de los Corchos y de Maroto o Galiano
 Porton de San Rafael
 Casa Consistorial, Cripta del antiguo convento franciscano
 Casa-Hermandad Museo de la Hermandad de NUestro Padre Jesús Nazareno
 Casa-Hermandad Museo de la Cofradía de la Santa Vera Cruz
 Museo del Pan, El Colmenero de Alhaurín
 Biblioteca Municipal "Ildefonso Marzo"
 Teatro Antonio Gala
 Parque La Libertad

Main sights
Some traces of the village's ancient past have survived. There is the 12th Century Moorish archway, the Arcos de Cobertizo. In the small plaza in front of the town hall, the Plaza del Ayuntamiento, are three Roman columns which were discovered close by at Fuente del Sol.

Metropolitan Bus
Malaga Metropolitan Transport Consortium's (Consorcio de Tranpsporte Metropolitano del Área de Málaga)  buses are the main form of transport around the city of Málaga and the villages of the Metropolitan Area.

Notable people
 Antonio Tejero, Spanish former Lieutenant Colonel of the Guardia Civil, and the most prominent figure in the failed 1981 Spanish coup d'état attempt
 Gerald Brenan, a British writer and hispanist who spent much of his life in Spain and died in Alhaurin el Grande.

References

External links

Alhaurín el Grande City Council Official Website
 Malaga Metropolitan Transport Consortium Website
Economic Study of Spain – Alhaurín el Grande
 St Anthonys College
 Tourist website for Alhaurin el Grande

Municipalities in the Province of Málaga